Ceramida is a genus of scarab beetles that are endemic to the southern Iberian Peninsula. Some of its species are pests, primarily of olive trees. Its taxonomy is uncertain due to its unclear diagnostic characteristics.

Species 
 Ceramida adusta
 Ceramida baraudi
 Ceramida bedeaui
 Ceramida brancoi
 Ceramida brandeiroi
 Ceramida cobosi
 Ceramida dinizi
 Ceramida longitarsis
 Ceramida malacensis
 Ceramida moelleri

References 

Melolonthinae
Beetles described in 1987
Beetles of Europe